Stretching Out is an album by the Zoot Sims-Bob Brookmeyer Octet recorded in 1958 for the United Artists label.

Reception

The Allmusic review by Ken Dryden stated: "Aside from a few innocuous reed squeaks, the music is essentially flawless and has stood the test of time very well. ...fans of cool jazz will want to locate a copy of this session".

Track listing
 "Stretching Out" (Bob Brookmeyer) - 6:07
 "Now Will You Be Good?" (Harry Pease, Arthur Terker, Harry Jentes) - 5:27
 "Pennies from Heaven" (Arthur Johnston, Johnny Burke) - 6:14
 "King Porter Stomp" (Jelly Roll Morton) - 4:37
 "Ain't Misbehavin'" (Harry Brooks, Fats Waller, Andy Razaf) - 6:52
 "Bee Kay" (Bill Potts) - 6:38

Personnel 
Zoot Sims - tenor saxophone
Bob Brookmeyer - valve trombone
Harry "Sweets" Edison - trumpet
Al Cohn- tenor saxophone, baritone saxophone
Hank Jones - piano
Freddie Green - guitar
Eddie Jones - bass
Charlie Persip - drums
Al Cohn (track 3), Bill Potts (track 6), Bob Brookmeyer (tracks 1, 2 & 3-5) - arranger

References 

1958 albums
United Artists Records albums
Bob Brookmeyer albums
Zoot Sims albums